John George Turnbull (born 27 August 1950) is an English pop and rock guitarist and singer. He is currently a member of The Blockheads.

Early life and education

Turnbull was born in Newcastle upon Tyne, Northumberland, England, on 27 August 1950.

Career
He has played in various bands, including Skip Bifferty, The Chosen Few, Arc, Loving Awareness, Glencoe, Nick Lowe, Dave Stewart and the Spiritual Cowboys, Eurythmics, Talk Talk, Londonbeat, Paul Young, Bob Geldof, World Party, Kaos Band and Ian Dury and the Blockheads.

He has played and sung on a number of film soundtracks, including Get Carter (1971), starring Michael Caine.

References

External links
 
 
 
 Theblockheads.com

1950 births
Living people
English pop guitarists
English male guitarists
English pop singers
English rock guitarists
English rock singers
English male singer-songwriters
Musicians from Newcastle upon Tyne
The Blockheads members
Dave Stewart and the Spiritual Cowboys members
20th-century British male singers
21st-century British male singers
20th-century British composers
20th-century English singers
20th-century English writers
21st-century British composers
21st-century English singers
21st-century English writers
20th-century British guitarists
21st-century British guitarists